Kacha (also Romanized as Kāchā and Kachā; also known as Kachā Pā’īn Maḩalleh, Kacheh, and Kechakh) is a village in Saravan Rural District, Sangar District, Rasht County, Gilan Province, Iran. At the 2006 census, its population was 486, in 134 families.

References 

Populated places in Rasht County